Upper Vaal WMA, or Upper Vaal Water Management Area (coded: 8), is a Water Management Area that includes the following major rivers: the Wilge River, Liebenbergsvlei River, Mooi River and Vaal River, and covers the following Dams:

 Boskop Dam Mooi River 
 Grootdraai Dam Vaal River 
 Klerkskraal Dam Mooi River 
 Klipdrift Dam Loop Spruit 
 Potchefstroom Dam Mooi River 
 Saulspoort Dam Liebenbergvlei 
 Sterkfontein Dam Nuwejaar Spruit 
 Vaal Dam Vaal River

Boundaries 
Tertiary drainage regions C11 to C13, C21 to C23, and C81 to C83.

References 

Hydrology

Water Management Areas
Dams in South Africa